Avicularia taunayi is a species of spider in the family Theraphosidae found in Brazil.

References

Theraphosidae
Spiders of Brazil
Spiders described in 1920